Coke Kahani is a 2012 Pakistani comedy drama sitcom directed by Mehreen Jabbar broadcasting on Broadcast syndication including PTV Home, Hum TV, Geo TV and other networks. Sitcom is written by Syed Mohammad Ahmed and Yasir Rana, starring Sonia Rehman, Faisal Rehman, Syra Yousuf, Syed Mohammad Ahmed, Yasir Hussain, Ahmed Zeb, Shamim Hilali. Sitcom was first aired on 3 November 2012.

Plot 
The TV series details the life of a young woman (Zoya) who is trying to resolve tensions between her father (Asfand) who runs a restaurant in city of Karachi called Alfonso, and mother (Maya) an artist residing in Florida. With the help of friends, she takes on the task of saving her family restaurant from going into ruins, and her family from breaking into pieces. The seamless, simple story of genuine human emotions of belonging, compassion, and love has deeper undercurrents that flow throughout the story, shedding light on various social realities pertaining to the South Asian region: identity politics, patriotism and the evolution of a hybrid culture of modernity and traditionalism.
It is not the story of landlords and big business tycoons, nor does it focus on glamorous lifestyles; it is an everyday tale of ordinary people tackling ordinary issues. The kahani revolves around the lives and dreams of characters from diverse socio-economic and ethnic backgrounds – reflecting the multicultural metro that is Karachi.

Cast 
 Sonia Rehman as Maya
 Faisal Rehman as Asfand Jehangir
 Syra Yousuf as Zoya
 Syed Mohammad Ahmed as Mutmain Sahib
 Yasir Hussain as Beydil
 Ahmed Zeb as Raiyaan
 Shamim Hilali as Nusrat
 Almas Fidai as Ruqaiya
 Mahira Khan as Herself (Special appearance)

References

External links 
 

Hum TV original programming
Urdu-language television shows
Pakistan Television Corporation original programming
2012 Pakistani television series debuts
Pakistani drama television series
Pakistani comedy television series
Pakistani television sitcoms
Urdu 1 original programming
Urdu 1
Television shows set in Karachi
2000s Pakistani television series
Yasir Hussain
Coca-Cola in popular culture